Franko Andrijašević (born 22 June 1991) is a Croatian professional footballer who plays as a midfielder for Zhejiang in the Chinese Super League.

Club career
A product of the Hajduk Split academy, Andrijašević made his professional debut on 13 May 2010 in a league match against Croatia Sesvete, in Hajduk's last match of the 2009–10 season. In August 2011, Andrijašević was loaned to second division side Dugopolje for a period of one year. On his debut against Hrvatski Dragovoljac, he scored the third goal in a 5–0 victory.

On 18 June 2014, Hajduk's fierce rival Dinamo Zagreb signed Andrijašević.

On 26 July 2016, Andrijašević signed a three-year contract with Rijeka, as part of the transfer of Marko Lešković from Rijeka to Dinamo Zagreb. In just one season, he became an instant fan-favourite, scoring 16 goals in the league, helping Rijeka win the first ever league title. He was also awarded with the Sportske novosti Yellow Shirt award for the best player of the league in the 2016-17 season.

Andrijašević joined K.A.A. Gent in July 2017 for a fee of €4.25 million.

He went on loan from Gent to Waasland-Beveren in January 2019.

He returned to Rijeka on loan in August 2019. In August 2020, his loan to Rijeka was extended for another season.

On 6 July 2021, China League One club Zhejiang announced the signing of Andrijašević. He would make his debut in a league game on 12 July 2021 against Beijing Sport University in a 1-0 defeat. After the game he would establish himself as a vital member of the team as the club gained promotion to the top tier at the end of the 2021 campaign.

International career
On 22 January 2013 national team head coach Igor Štimac called up Andrijašević for a friendly match against South Korea in London on 6 February 2013. He made his debut as a substitute in the 65th minute of the game.

Personal life 
Franko is son of Stjepan Andrijašević and brother of Pjero Andrijašević.

Career statistics

International

Scores and results list Croatia's goal tally first, score column indicates score after each Andrijašević goal.

Honours
Dugopolje
Druga HNL: 2011–12

Hajduk Split
Croatian Cup: 2012–13

Dinamo Zagreb
Prva HNL: 2014–15
Croatian Cup: 2014–15

RijekaPrva HNL: 2016–17
Croatian Cup: 2016–17, 2019–20Individual'''
Croatian Football Hope of the Year: 2012
Football Oscar - Team of the Year: 2013, 2017
HNL’s Footballer of the Year: 2016
Sportske novosti Yellow Shirt award: 2017

References

External links

1991 births
Living people
Footballers from Split, Croatia
Association football midfielders
Croatian footballers
Croatia youth international footballers
Croatia under-21 international footballers
Croatia international footballers
Croatian expatriate footballers
Croatian Football League players
First Football League (Croatia) players
HNK Hajduk Split players
NK Dugopolje players
GNK Dinamo Zagreb players
NK Lokomotiva Zagreb players
HNK Rijeka players
K.A.A. Gent players
S.K. Beveren players
Zhejiang Professional F.C. players
Belgian Pro League players
China League One players
Expatriate footballers in Belgium
Expatriate footballers in China
Croatian expatriate sportspeople in Belgium
Croatian expatriate sportspeople in China